The Jester Calabacillas is a portrait by Velázquez of Don Juan Martín Martín, "Juan de Calabazas" or "El Búfón Calabacillas", a jester at the court of Philip IV of Spain, sometimes known by the nickname Bizco. It is now in the Prado Museum. The jester had mental illness(s), and would often rub his hands together in a form of tic; however, Velazquez painted him in a relatively calm state, further showing Velazquez's equal show of dignity to all, whether king or jester.

As well as the painting now in the Museo del Prado, the jester is the subject of a painting in the USA,
The Jester Calabacillas (Cleveland).

Bibliography 
Museo del Prado. Pintura española de los siglos XVI y XVII. Enrique Lafuente Ferrari. Aguilar S.A. 1964

Portraits by Diego Velázquez in the Museo del Prado
1639 paintings
17th-century portraits
Portraits of men